Liny-devant-Dun (literally Liny before Dun) is a commune in the Meuse department in Grand Est in north-eastern France.

See also
Communes of the Meuse department

References

Linydevantdun
Three Bishoprics